The Honolulu Star-Advertiser is the largest daily newspaper in Hawaii, formed in 2010 with the merger of The Honolulu Advertiser and the Honolulu Star-Bulletin after the acquisition of the former by Black Press, which already owned the latter.

History

On February 25, 2010, Canadian publisher Black Press Ltd., which owned the Honolulu Star-Bulletin, purchased The Honolulu Advertiser, then owned by Gannett Corporation for $125 million. As part of the deal to acquire the Advertiser, Black Press agreed to place the Star-Bulletin on the selling block. If no buyer came forward by March 29, 2010, Black Press would start making preparations to operate both papers through a transitional management team and then combine the two dailies into one.

On March 30, 2010, three parties came forward with offers to buy the Star-Bulletin, but a month later on April 27, 2010, the bids were rejected because their bids for the Star-Bulletin were below the minimum liquidation price. Black Press canceled the sale and proceeded with transition plans, which came on the same day that they were approved to take over the Advertiser by the United States Department of Justice. On May 3, 2010, a new company set up by Black Press, HA Management, took over the operations of the paper, while Black Press continued overseeing the Star-Bulletin during a 30- to 60-day transition period, after which both papers merged into one daily, The Honolulu Star-Advertiser.

Both the Advertiser and the Star-Bulletin published their final editions as separate publications on June 6, 2010, and Black Press officially launched the Honolulu Star-Advertiser as a broadsheet morning daily on June 7, 2010.

Format and operations
Prior to the merger, the Honolulu Advertiser published in broadsheet format while the Honolulu Star-Bulletin published in tabloid format. The Star-Advertiser uses the Advertiser'''s broadsheet format, while using a modified Star-Bulletin masthead (with the name "Advertiser" replacing "Bulletin" in the masthead's blackletter font).

The newsroom for the combined paper is out of the former Star-Bulletin offices in Restaurant Row, with the paper printed and distributed from the Advertiser'''s facilities in Kapolei.  About 453 jobs were eliminated in the consolidation, leaving a combined staff of 474.

The paper sells in retail outlets for $1.50 on Oahu daily and $3.00 on Sunday.

References

External links

 
 

Newspapers published in Hawaii
Mass media in Honolulu
Black Press
Publications established in 2010
2010 establishments in Hawaii
Daily newspapers published in the United States